James John Calado (born 13 June 1989) is a British professional racing driver from England, currently competing in the FIA World Endurance Championship and other selected GT races for AF Corse. He won the LMGTE Pro class of the 2017 FIA World Endurance Championship and 2019 24 Hours of Le Mans. He drove for Panasonic Jaguar Racing in Formula E. His career has been funded by the Racing Steps Foundation.

Early career

Karting
Born in Cropthorne, Worcestershire, Calado had an extensive karting career, starting out at Cadets level in 1999. After being a member of the 2000 championship-winning England Inter-Nations Cadet Team, Calado won the British Cadet Championship in 2001, and also finished runner-up to Daniel Rowbottom in the Super 1 Cadet series, losing out by thirteen points. In 2002, Calado stepped up to TKM Juniors, finishing fifth in the Super 1 championship. 2003 saw Calado contest pan-European series for the first time, driving a Gillard Parilla kart for the PDB Racing Team in the ICA Junior class. He finished runner-up to Nicholas Risitano in the European Championship, beating future Formula One drivers Sébastien Buemi and Jaime Alguersuari.

He moved to Tony Kart for the 2004 season, and once again finished in the top three of the European Championship; this time finishing third behind Stefano Coletti and Jules Bianchi. He also finished fifth in the Andrea Margutti Trophy, and ninth in the Italian Open Masters. He moved up to the ICA class in 2005, and won the European Championship ahead of his future team-mate Jean-Éric Vergne, and also finished runner-up to Armando Parente in the Italian Open Masters. He returned to the UK to contest the Renault Elite League in the Super Libre class, finishing seventh in the championship.

Calado moved into the top class of international karting in 2006, moving into the Formula A class. Sixth in the Italian Open Masters, Calado went to Macau for the International Kart Grand Prix, where he finished as runner-up to Michael Christensen. His final season of karting, in 2007, saw his fourth top-five placing in the European Championship, as well as a third-place finish in the Margutti Trophy. He also placed ninth in the South Garda Winter Cup.

Formula Renault

Calado moved into the British Formula Renault Championship for the 2008 season, driving for Fortec Motorsport. With no prior single-seater experience, Calado was placed into the Graduate Cup for first-year drivers. Calado finished runner-up to Dean Stoneman in that championship, and he finished seventh in the overall championship. He took two pole positions at Snetterton and Oulton Park, with one victory coming at Snetterton from that pole. He also earned three other podium placings throughout the season. Calado also contested two rounds of the Formula Renault 2.0 Northern European Cup at Zolder and Spa-Francorchamps. He earned two top-five finishes en route to finishing 25th in the overall championship standings, amassing 38 points. At the conclusion of the season, Calado enter the Winter Series of both the British and Portuguese Formula Renault championships. Over the two championships' eight total races, Calado took five pole positions, six fastest laps and five victories en route to both championships; holding Henry Surtees off by just three points in the British Winter Series.

Calado continued in the British series for the 2009 season, staying with Fortec for his sophomore campaign. Calado and Alpine Motorsport's Stoneman, both in their second season and boasting victories in their début season in the series, with pre-season testing further backing media predictions that the championship would most likely be decided between the pair. Calado was the most successful driver in the series, taking a total of eight victories, winning races at seven of the championship's ten meetings during the season. He also earned ten pole positions, and set the fastest lap of the race on seven occasions. However, retirements at Thruxton, Oulton Park and Croft took the title out of the hands of Calado and into the hands of Dean Smith, who joined the series at the second round of the championship. Calado ultimately finished as runner-up behind Smith, 34 points behind the Wolverhampton driver. Calado also contested three rounds of the Eurocup Formula Renault 2.0 for Fortec, competing in Barcelona, Spa and Le Mans. He finished seventeenth in the championship, amassing ten points from a fifth in Barcelona and seventh at Spa. He lost a podium finish at Barcelona due to a puncture with two laps remaining, which could have ultimately turned into a win after the post-race disqualification of winner Albert Costa.

Formula Three (2010)
Calado moved into the British Formula 3 Championship for the 2010 season, as part of a six-car title challenge by Carlin. He was the second RSF-funded driver to drive for the team, after Oliver Turvey finished runner-up in the 2008 championship. He took five victories to finish second in the championship, behind runaway leader Jean-Éric Vergne.

GP3 Series (2011)
Calado moved up to the GP3 Series for 2011, driving for the Lotus ART team alongside Pedro Nunes, Richie Stanaway and Valtteri Bottas. In a successful season for ART, Bottas won the championship whilst Calado backed him up with second in the drivers' standings, taking a single win at Valencia and five further podium finishes. ART also won the teams' championship.

GP2 Series (2011-2013)

Calado made his GP2 Series début by driving for ART in the non-championship race at Yas Marina which concluded the 2011 season. He had a victorious race in the sprint race, the second race of the weekend. He joined the Lotus-branded team full-time for the 2012 season, alongside second-year driver Esteban Gutiérrez. He continued his form from the non-championship race by winning the sprint race of the first round of the season in Malaysia. After taking pole positions for the Spanish rounds at Catalunya and Valencia, but not being able to convert them into victories, he won his second race of the season at Hockenheim. At this stage of the championship, he was third in the drivers' standings, but a poor run in the final four races—after crashing in practice at Monza and suffering from food poisoning in Singapore saw him overhauled by team-mate Gutiérrez and compatriot Max Chilton. Nevertheless, his fifth place in the championship meant that he finished the season as the series' most successful rookie driver, ahead of Felipe Nasr in tenth position. Autosport magazine rated Calado as the GP2 season's best driver, due to his inexperience compared to the drivers who finished ahead of him in the championship.

Lotus GP became ART once again for the 2013 season and he was joined by rookie Daniel Abt. A consistent season saw him claim two sprint race wins and another five podiums meant he finished third in the standings on 157 points but quite a distance behind the top two Fabio Leimer and Sam Bird.

Formula One

Force India (2013)

Partway through the 2013 season, Formula One team Force India selected him for the Young Driver's test in July, held at Silverstone. He had a successful test, setting the fourth fastest time on the first day. As a result of this, and his good GP2 form, Force India announced that they had selected Calado as their third driver for the Italian Grand Prix on 2 September 2013, and that he would run in the first practice session.

Formula E 
In June 2019, Calado partook in testing sessions with Panasonic Jaguar Racing.

On 2 October 2019, it was announced that Calado would partner Mitch Evans in the Panasonic Jaguar team, replacing Alex Lynn.

He made his debut with the team at the 2019 Diriyah ePrix, crashing during qualifying for the first race & finishing 16th. He struggled during qualifying the following day but showed excellent race pace & in a race of attrition stayed out of the carnage to record his first points in 7th. He continued his points-scoring form at the next race in Santiago, where he finished in 8th. He would have finished in 9th at the 2020 Mexico City ePrix, but was later disqualified for a technical issue. He lacked pace in Marrakesh despite qualifying well & dropped to 16th position.

Sportscar career

AF Corse 

For 2014, Calado joined Italian Davide Rigon at AF Corse, making his debut at the 6 Hours of Silverstone where the pair finished in 5th position behind their teammates, Finn Toni Vilander and Italian Gianmaria Bruni. Calado and Rigon celebrated a podium in the second race of the season at the 6 Hours of Spa-Francorchamps. For Calado it was his first podium in sportcars. For 2016 he joins Italian Gianmaria Bruni.

In 2017 is joined by Alessandro Pier Guidi and won the world championship. In 2019 he won the 24 Hours of Le Mans together with Pier Guidi and Daniel Serra behind the wheel of the #51 AF Corse Ferrari 488 GTE Evo. In 2021 he won the 24 Hours of Le Mans for the second time, together with Pier Guidi and Ledogar

IMSA Weathertech Sportscar Championship

He made his debut in 2016 24 Hours of Daytona with the Ferrari 488 GTE of SMP Racing and take part in some selected races in following years, all with Risi Competizione. He won the 2016 and 2019 Petit Le Mans with the 488 GTE and scored podiums at 24 Hours of Daytona and 12 Hours of Sebring

Hypercar
Going into the 2023 season, Calado would join the Ferrari Hypercar project run by AF Corse, competing in the WEC with a Ferrari 499P alongside Alessandro Pier Guidi and Antonio Giovinazzi.

Racing record

Career summary

* Season still in progress.

Complete British Formula 3 International Series results 
(key) (Races in bold indicate pole position; races in italics indicate fastest lap)

Complete GP3 Series results
(key) (Races in bold indicate pole position) (Races in italics indicate fastest lap)

Complete GP2 Series results
(key) (Races in bold indicate pole position) (Races in italics indicate fastest lap)

Complete GP2 Final results
(key) (Races in bold indicate pole position) (Races in italics indicate fastest lap)

Complete Formula One participations
(key) (Races in bold indicate pole position) (Races in italics indicates fastest lap)

Complete FIA World Endurance Championship results
(key) (Races in bold indicate pole position; races in
italics indicate fastest lap)

* Season still in progress.

Complete 24 Hours of Le Mans results

Complete IMSA SportsCar Championship results
(key) (Races in bold indicate pole position; races in italics indicate fastest lap)

* Season still in progress.

Complete Formula E results
(key) (Races in bold indicate pole position; races in italics indicate fastest lap)

References

External links
 
 

1989 births
Living people
English racing drivers
People from Wychavon (district)
24 Hours of Le Mans drivers
Formula Renault 2.0 NEC drivers
Portuguese Formula Renault 2.0 drivers
Formula Renault Eurocup drivers
British Formula Renault 2.0 drivers
British Formula Three Championship drivers
GP3 Series drivers
GP2 Series drivers
FIA World Endurance Championship drivers
English people of Portuguese descent
European Le Mans Series drivers
24 Hours of Daytona drivers
WeatherTech SportsCar Championship drivers
Sportspeople from Worcestershire
Formula E drivers
Carlin racing drivers
ART Grand Prix drivers
AF Corse drivers
Asian Le Mans Series drivers
Blancpain Endurance Series drivers
Fortec Motorsport drivers
SMP Racing drivers
Jaguar Racing drivers
Ferrari Competizioni GT drivers
Iron Lynx drivers